Aziz Ahmad may refer to:

 Aziz Ahmad (buzkashi) (born 1964), buzkashi player from Afghanistan.
 Aziz Ahmad (novelist) (1914–1978), Urdu poet, writer, historian and critic from Pakistan.